Banza may refer to:

 M'banza-Kongo, formerly known as São Salvador, the capital of Zaire Province, Angola
 Banza (katydid), a katydid genus endemic to Hawaii
 Banza, Central African Republic, a town that is near to Karawa, Central African Republic
 An alternative name for the banjo
 Banza, a barangay of Butuan City, Agusan del Norte, Philippines
 Banza, a company that produces noodles with garbanzo beans (or chickpeas)

People with the surname
 Alexandre Banza (1932–1969), Central African military officer and politician
 Céline Banza (born 1997), singer-songwriter and guitarist from the DR Congo
 Jean-Kasongo Banza (born 1974), retired professional football player from the DR Congo
Kongo-language surnames